Capoeta banarescui. the Colchic scraper or Banarescu's barb, is a  species of cyprinid fish known from Turkey. It inhabits swiftly flowing water with cobbles and pebbles bottom.

It is only known from northeast Turkey from the Çoruh River system, which drains through Georgia to the  Black Sea.  It was distinguished from Capoeta tinca (the Anatolian khramulya) as an independent species in 2006.

References 

banarescui
Taxa named by Maurice Kottelat
Fish described in 2006